The 2007 NCAA Division II Men's Soccer Championship was the 36th annual tournament held by the NCAA to determine the top men's Division II college soccer program in the United States. Thirty-two teams participated in the tournament.

The Franklin Pierce Ravens defeated Lincoln Memorial, 1–0, at the D-II Championship Festival, held in Orange Beach, Alabama, and hosted by the University of West Florida. David Clifton scored the match's lone goal in the 89th minute to give the Ravens men's team their first national title.

Franklin Pierce, who finished the season 17-2-4, were coached by Marco Koolman.

Brackets

Pool 1

Pool 2

Final

See also  
 NCAA Division I Men's Soccer Championship
 NCAA Division III Men's Soccer Championship
 NAIA Men's Soccer Championship

References

NCAA Division II Men's Soccer Championship
NCAA Division II Mens Soccer
NCAA Division II Mens Soccer
NCAA Division II Men's Soccer Championship
Soccer in Alabama